Selmania is a genus of leaf beetles in the subfamily Eumolpinae, found in Africa. Most of the species in the genus were originally placed in Rhembastus.

The genus was originally named Massartia by Brian John Selman in 1965, but it was later found that the name had already been used for a dinoflagellate and a hemipteran. Because of this, Stefano Zoia renamed the genus to Selmania in 2019.

Species
Eight species are included in the genus:
 Selmania albertiana (Burgeon, 1941)
 Selmania colasposomoides (Burgeon, 1941)
 Selmania hartmanni Zoia, 2019
 Selmania irregularis (Jacoby, 1900)
 Selmania minima (Burgeon, 1942)
 Selmania nigrita (Selman, 1972)
 Selmania schoutedeni (Burgeon, 1941)
 Selmania sprecherae (Zoia, 2010)

References

Eumolpinae
Chrysomelidae genera
Beetles of Africa